Vangchhia is a village in the Champhai district of Mizoram, India. It is located in the Khawbung R.D. Block.

The 171 menhir stones in the village became Mizoram's first protected archaeological site in 2012.

Demographics 

According to the 2011 census of India, Vangchhia has 153 households. The effective literacy rate (i.e. the literacy rate of population excluding children aged 6 and below) is 96.87%.

Society 

The Vangchhia tribe is native to this village. Vangchhia is the name of one of the eleven sub-tribes of Mizoram.  They along with genealogically related clans like the Khawlhring, Pautu, Saivate, etc. form the greater Faihriem group of clans. They trace their descent from Chunthang, the son of Berhva.  Traditions maintain that Chunthang was a very good man, and his good character earned him the hands of the Biete princess, Lalzaii. However, the couple could not nurture any child to maturity. The offspring out of the wedlock died at infancy. One night, in his dream he was told that the next child should be arranged to be born in another village and the child will survive. So, when the time for delivery of the next child came, the mother was taken to the village of the Thiek clan where she delivered a healthy boy. As the boy was born in another village, he was named 'Khualhring'. The boy later on became the progenitor of the Khawlhring clan. When the time for the next child came, Chunthang was again told to arrange for the child to be kept below the 'vang' tree near their house to ensure his survival. It was done so, and the child survived. The child was named 'Vangsie' or Vangchhia, indicating his first bed below the tree. Later, his descendants came to be known by that name. There are still Vangchhia with royal blood in them but records have been lost in time.

References 

Villages in Khawbung block